PUP may refer to:

Organizations
 Polytechnic University of the Philippines
 Princeton University Press
 Public-public partnership,  a partnership with a government body

Politics
 Palmer United Party, a political party of Australia
 Party of Proletarian Unity, a political party of France
 People's United Party, a political party of Belize
 Progressive Unionist Party, a political party of Northern Ireland
 Proletarian Unity Party (France), a former political party of France
 Protestant Unionist Party, a former political party of Northern Ireland
 Unity and Progress Party, a political party of Guinea

Technology
 PARC Universal Packet, one of the two earliest internetworking communications protocols
 Potentially unwanted program, computer malware

Other uses
 COVID-19 Pandemic Unemployment Payment, available to Irish residents working in a business sector, i.e. catering, that has been shut due to the virus
 Power Utility Profile, a Precision Time Protocol for electrical substations IEC/IEEE 61850-9-3
 Physically unable to perform, a rule in the NFL
 PUP (band), a Canadian punk rock band
 PUP (album), 2013

See also
 Pup (disambiguation)
 Party of United Pensioners of Serbia, a Serbian political party